This is the list of the 7 members of the European Parliament for Slovenia in the 2004 to 2009 session.

List

Party representation

Notes

2004-2009
List
Slovenia